The 252nd Sinai Division is an Israel Defense Forces division under the Southern Regional Command. Formed in 1968, it was the first permanent division in the IDF.  As of July 2016, it is commanded by Brigadier General Saar Tzur.

History
The unit was created in 1968 in an effort to unify Israeli armoured forces in the Sinai, taking an active part in the War of Attrition. It later took an active part in the Yom Kippur War. During the First Lebanon War, it operated on the eastern wing of the Israeli forces pushing into Lebanon. In the 21st. century, the division has been charged with securing the border with Egypt.

Units

 252nd "Sinai" (Reserve) Division
 10th "Harel" (Reserve) Armor Brigade
 12th "Negev" (Reserve) Infantry Brigade
 14th "Machatz/Bison" (Reserve) Armor Brigade (In Hebrew)
16th Jerusalem Brigade (In Hebrew) 
 646th "Sky Fox" (Reserve) Paratroopers Brigade 
 425th "Fire Flame" (Reserve) Artillery Regiment
 Division Signal Battalion

References

Southern Command (Israel)
Divisions of Israel
Military units and formations established in 1968